Minuscule 639 (in the Gregory-Aland numbering, α 169 Soden). It is a Greek minuscule manuscript of the New Testament, on a parchment. It is dated palaeographically to the 11th century. The manuscript is lacunose. Formerly it was labeled by 192a and 246p.

Description 

The codex contains the text of the Acts of the Apostles, Catholic epistles, and Pauline epistles on 237 parchment leaves (20.5 by 15.5 cm) with some lacunae (Acts 21:6-23; 1 Peter 5:10-14). Some leaves were supplied on paper by a later hand. The text is written in one column per page, 22-24 lines per page in minuscule letters. The last folio, no. 237, is a palimpsest, the lower text was written in uncial letters, and belongs to the codex 0132.

Some lacking leaves were supplied in the 14th century on a paper, by one Micheal (Acts 1:1-3:20; 7:27-10:26; 10:38-11:19; 12:2-15:25).

The order of books: Acts of the Apostles, Catholic epistles, and Pauline epistles. Epistle to the Hebrews is placed after Epistle to Philemon.

Text 

The Greek text of the codex is a representative of the Byzantine text-type. Aland placed it in Category V.

History 

The manuscript was described by Kitchin. It was added to the list of New Testament manuscripts by Scrivener. Formerly it was labeled by 192a and 246p. In 1908 Gregory gave the number 639 to it.

The codex now is located in Christ Church College (Wake 37) at Oxford.

See also 

 List of New Testament minuscules
 Textual criticism
 Biblical manuscript
 Minuscule 638

References 

Greek New Testament minuscules
11th-century biblical manuscripts
Palimpsests